Judalana is a genus of jumping spiders. It is an ant mimic found only in Queensland. Its only species is Judalana lutea.

References

Salticidae
Endemic fauna of Australia
Spiders of Australia
Monotypic Salticidae genera